Falkland, previously in the Lands of Kilgour ( 1200), is a village, parish and former royal burgh in Fife, Scotland, at the foot of the Lomond Hills. According to the 2008 population estimate, it has a population of 1,180.

Etymology
The earliest forms of this name include Falleland (c. 1128) and Falecklen (c. 1160), with the second element being the Scottish Gaelic lann (enclosure) or possibly its Pictish cognate, but the exact etymology is unclear since the first element could be the Gaelic falach (hidden), failc (wash), or falc (heavy rain). The later folk etymologies "falcon land" and "folkland" are not plausible.

In the Middle Ages, the name Falkland only applied to the Castle; the burgh and parish were known as Kilgour, which may mean "church/cell of Gabrán".

History 
The lands of Kilgour existed at Falkland prior to the 12th century. However, this was not until the erection of Falkland Castle some time after 1160 which was the crucial factor in the birth of the village. The site of Falkland Castle now lies within the grounds of the present Falkland Palace. The donation of the royal hunting estate of Falkland by King Malcolm to Duncan, Earl of Fife in 1160, may actually have led to any previous hunting lodge being replaced by the castle.

The church of Kilgour was to west of the present town. The benefice was counted as part of the Priory of Saint Andrews. It is known that an African servant of Anne of Denmark was buried in the kirk yard there in July 1591. The benefice was counted as part of the Priory of Saint Andrews. It is known that coffins rested at a spot called the "Pillars of Hercules" on the way to Kilgour. A replacement church was built in Falkland town about thirty years later by the master mason John Mylne and his son, and the site of the old church at Kilgour is now a farm.  Today, the parish church of Falkland is a Destination Hub on the St Margaret Pilgrim Journey.

Despite being granted royal burgh status in 1458, Falkland had developed as a medieval settlement dependent on Falkland Palace and the Falkland Castle and therefore did not function in the same way as other royal burghs did.

Falkland was the birthplace of the famous 17th century Covenanter Richard Cameron who was the town schoolmaster before he became a field preacher. His house still stands in the main street of the village. Another Covenanter, Robert Gillespie was arrested for preaching here before being imprisoned on the Bass Rock. The American country and western singer Johnny Cash traced part of his family ancestry to this district of Fife.

A considerable proportion of the village (including the Palace) was restored by John, Marquis of Bute who inherited much of the land in the late 19th century. He employed the architects John Kinross and Robert Weir Schultz to undertake the works required.

The Falkland Islands in the South Atlantic are named after Anthony Cary, 5th Viscount Falkland.

Landmarks 

Scotland's first conservation village is best known as the location of Falkland Palace, begun in 1500 by James IV, and the best example of French-influenced Renaissance architecture in Scotland. The palace was built to accommodate the royal court when they came to Falkland to hunt in the nearby forests; Mary, Queen of Scots, was a frequent visitor. The palace houses a Roman Catholic church which was used for the undertaking of mass.

As at Holyrood Palace in Edinburgh, a fire broke out during the occupation of the buildings by Oliver Cromwell's troops in 1654. The fire destroyed the East Range. The Court never returned to Falkland Palace after 1665 and until the 19th century the village and palace were neglected. In the late 19th century extensive rebuilding and restoration work began. Today the palace and gardens are open to the public through the National Trust for Scotland.

Falkland contains a number of Listed buildings, including five at Category A:

Falkland Palace (also its royal stables and tennis court)
The House of Falkland
Falkland Town Hall
Moncrief House
Brunton House

Culture 
Other features of the village include an old horse market, also including the Falkland Cricket Club, and the Falkland Golf Club. One of the country's leading environmental festivals, The Big Tent, was held for several years up to 2012 in the grounds of Falkland Estate in July. Organised by the Falkland Centre for Stewardship, the 2012 festival was headlined by the Proclaimers and the 2010 event by Rosanne Cash. Since 2016 the main event of the year has been the Craft Symposium. The 2018 Symposium, held in August, celebrates traditional crafts and craftsmanship through talks, discussions, workshops, demonstrations, networking and site tours.

The Falkland Library and Falkland Community Hall are run on behalf of the community by Falkland Community Development Trust, an organisation established to maintain, develop and/or operate a centre or centres providing facilities for a wide range of community activities and accommodation for community groups, and for public sector agencies which provide services of benefit to the community. All residents of Falkland can become members of the trust.

The Falkland Society holds regular meetings with speakers, and has published several books about the village.

Sport
Falkland has one of the oldest real tennis courts, which was built for James V of Scotland in 1539. It is the oldest tennis court in use today, and the only active tennis court without a roof. Play is organized by the Falkland Palace Royal Tennis Club.

Notable residents

Rev George Buist (1779-1860) Moderator of the General Assembly of the Church of Scotland in 1848 was minister of Falkland 1802 to 1813.
Sir David Deas, born and raised in Falkland

References

External links 

Royal Burgh of Falkland and Newton of Falkland Community Council
Visit Falkland
Engraving of Falkland in 1693 by John Slezer at National Library of Scotland
The Falkland Society
Historic Falkland
Falkland Historic Buildings wiki

 
Villages in Fife
Parishes in Fife
Royal burghs